Adam Farag, professionally known as 4th Pyramid, is a hip hop recording artist, producer, songwriter and DJ from Toronto, Ontario of Egyptian descent. He is currently the official DJ for Toronto rapper and Juno-award winner Jazz Cartier.

Career

Beginnings 
4th Pyramid entered the hip hop scene with the release of his self-produced debut album, The Light is But a Shade of the Darkness', an instrumental full-length. Chuck D of Public Enemy handpicked 4th Pyramid's 'Wallabee Strut' as one of the best 100 MP3s of 2000. He was signed to rap label Definitive Jux, owned by El-P (Run the Jewels), and appeared on the album Definitive Jux Presents III. During this time, he also collaborated with label mates including Cannibal Ox and Camu Tao.

Rap 
4th Pyramid released his debut solo rap album The Pyramid Scheme in 2012 after signing a deal with Universal Music Canada. The album included the single "It's So Hot" featuring Greg Nice of Nice and Smooth in 2010. The track was featured in the film 21 and Over and also appeared on the film's soundtrack. The album also included collaborations with Saukrates, Marco Polo & more. In 2013, he released the EP The Sky Belongs To The Stars which included the single "Friday Nights" produced by Grandtheft. He has toured with Wu-Tang Clan, ASAP Rocky, De La Soul, Elzhi, The Pharcyde and others.

Production 
4th Pyramid has produced and engineered tracks for the Black Eyed Peas, members of Wu-Tang Clan, Pete Rock and others.

DJ 
4th Pyramid formed the DJ group, Sheen Bros with Philadelphia DJ, Cosmo Baker and they released several mixtapes together and an EP through the Scion/AV label. 4th Pyramid continues to DJ internationally and is currently the official DJ for Capitol Records recording artist, Jazz Cartier. The two have toured Europe, North America and Canada including a tour with Post Malone.

Discography

Albums

Singles

Production and appearances

References 

Living people
Canadian hip hop DJs
Canadian hip hop record producers
Canadian people of Egyptian descent
Canadian male songwriters
Musicians from Toronto
Year of birth missing (living people)